The Human Performance Center is a 1,760-seat multi-purpose arena on the campus of the University of New Orleans in New Orleans, Louisiana. It is the home venue for the New Orleans Privateers volleyball team. The arena became the permanent home of the volleyball team in 2012 following years of alternating between the Performance Center and Lakefront Arena.

Since 2008, the Human Performance Center has been the home venue of the Big Easy Rollergirls, New Orleans' WFTDA flat track roller derby league.

History
The venue, known to fans as the "Chamber of Horrors", was home to the New Orleans Privateers men's basketball team from its inception in 1969–70 until the opening of Lakefront Arena in 1983. During that period, the venue was officially known as the Health & Physical Education Center. The arena was used as the temporary home of the UNO men's and women's basketball teams from the 2005–2006 season until 2008 while Lakefront Arena was being repaired following Hurricane Katrina.

The facility hosted LHSAA state wrestling tournaments in 1975 and 1995.

References 

Basketball venues in New Orleans
College basketball venues in the United States
College volleyball venues in the United States
Defunct college basketball venues in the United States
Indoor arenas in New Orleans
Indoor arenas in Louisiana
New Orleans Privateers men's basketball
New Orleans Privateers women's basketball
New Orleans Privateers women's volleyball
Volleyball venues in New Orleans
1969 establishments in Louisiana
Sports venues completed in 1969